Tarati, is a village in Adhi Union Council, Gujar Khan Tehsil, Rawalpindi District, Punjab, Pakistan, in the centre of the Pothohar cultural region. The area has considerable natural resources in the form of petroleum and natural gas. It is approximately 45 kilometres southeast of Islamabad, the capital of Pakistan.

Economics
Tarati is a mainly agricultural village, with wheat and groundnuts as the major crops.

Languages
The local language is Pothowari.

Transport
Tarati is situated off the Daultala – Mulhal Mughlan Road. Gujar Khan is about 18 kilometers, Rawalpindi - Islamabad is about 45 kilometers and Chakwal is about 26 kilometers from Tarati.

References

Populated places in Rawalpindi District